Cabia  (Friulian: Cjabie) is a frazione of the comune of Arta Terme, Friuli, north-eastern Italy, in the Carnia traditional region. It is a village located at 753 m across the Valle di Incarojo and the Val Bût, near the Monte Sernio, the Monte Amarana and the valley of Tolmezzo.

The population is some 280.

Cities and towns in Friuli-Venezia Giulia
Frazioni of the Province of Udine